The Hero is an American reality competition TV series hosted by Dwayne Johnson. It premiered on TNT on June 6, 2013, and was cancelled on August 1, 2013.  Contestants are tested "physically, mentally, and morally" for the title of "hero" and a monetary prize.

Cast

: Age at the time of filming.

Challenges

Game progression

Standings

Money Table

Ratings

Season 1

References

External links
 
 
 The Hero on TV.com

2010s American reality television series
2013 American television series debuts
2013 American television series endings
2010s American game shows
English-language television shows
TNT (American TV network) original programming